The 2006–07 Bill Beaumont Cup (Rugby Union County Championship) was the 107th edition of England's County Championship rugby union club competition. 

Devon won their 10th title after defeating Lancashire in the final. 

The Championship was renamed the Bill Beaumont Cup in honour of Bill Beaumont.

Final

See also
 English rugby union system
 Rugby union in England

References

Rugby Union County Championship
County Championship (rugby union) seasons